The Great Northern Concrete Toboggan Race (GNCTR) is an annual event that challenges the creativity of engineering students.  The competition originated in 1974 and was created by Dr. S. H. Simmonds, president of the Alberta chapter of the American Concrete Institute. The first race was held in 1975 with participants from the University of Alberta, University of Calgary, Northern Alberta Institute of Technology, and Southern Alberta Institute of Technology. Since its beginning, GNCTR has grown to include universities and technical schools from across Canada with occasional entries from the United States and Europe.

Rules
The project involves designing and constructing a toboggan with a metal frame and a running surface made completely out of concrete and racing it down a steep snow-covered hill.  The sled must weigh less than 350 pounds (158.8 kg), have a working braking system, and be fitted with a roll cage to protect its five passengers.  Each competing team must complete a technical report summarizing the design, which is presented at a public technical exhibition.

Spirit
It is traditional for teams to choose a theme for their sled; they often wear appropriate costumes and incorporate elements of the design into their technical exhibit and sled aesthetics. Themes have become a major part of the competition, making up a large part of the spirit award, as well as the best uniforms award. Theme ideas are most often drawn from popular culture, retro references, or are based on the team's home university/college and its location.

Awards
Teams are judged for top speed, best run, most improved, braking, steering, and aesthetics.  Each year, an award is also given for the best overall entry.

The current record holder for top speed in a successfully completed run at GNCTR is the University of Toronto, who set a speed of 73 km/h on Feb 1, 2020.

Competition host
In the early years of the competition, the winning team was asked to host the subsequent competition. By the mid-1990s, this practice had changed to an alternating scheme between Western and Eastern Canadian schools; the dividing line is the Manitoba-Ontario border. The competition usually runs from Wednesday to Sunday, at the end of January or over the first weekend in February.

See also
Concrete canoe

References

External links
Official GNCTR 2019 Website
Official GNCTR 2018 Website
 University of British Columbia's Team Website
 Carleton University's Official GNCTR Team Website
 University of Calgary GNCTR Website
 Dalhousie University's GNCTR Website
 McMaster University GNCTR Website
 Université de Sherbrooke's Toboggus Team Website
 University of Toronto GNCTR Website
 University of Waterloo GNCTR Website
 Western Engineering Toboggan Team Website
 SAIT's GNCTR Website
 Queen's GNCTR Website

Sledding
Concrete
Sports competitions in Canada
1974 establishments in Alberta
Recurring sporting events established in 1974